Eric Ayala (born January 2, 1999) is a Puerto Rican professional basketball player for Keflavík in the Icelandic top-tier Úrvalsdeild karla. He played college basketball for Maryland.

High school career
Ayala played basketball for Sanford School in Hockessin, Delaware. After his sophomore season, he transferred to Putnam Science Academy in Putnam, Connecticut. Ayala played a postgraduate season at IMG Academy in Bradenton, Florida. A consensus four-star recruit, he committed to playing college basketball for Maryland over offers from Miami (Florida) and Oregon.

College career

As a freshman, Ayala became a regular starter at Maryland, averaging 8.6 points, 2.9 rebounds and 2.1 assists per game. In his sophomore season, he averaged 8.5 points, 2.9 rebounds and 2.5 assists per game, shooting 35.8 percent from the field. In his junior season, he became his team's primary point guard with the departure of Anthony Cowan Jr. Ayala averaged 15.1 points, 4.3 rebounds and 2.2 assists per game as a junior, earning All-Big Ten honorable mention. He declared for the 2021 NBA draft while maintaining his college eligibility, before ultimately returning. Ayala was named Honorable Mention All-Big Ten by the media as a senior.

Professional career
In September 2022, Ayala signed with Keflavík of the Icelandic Úrvalsdeild karla after originally having signed with Sopron during the summer.

National team career
Ayala represented Puerto Rico at the 2015 FIBA Americas Under-16 Championship in Argentina, averaging 19.6 points, 6.8 rebounds and 2.8 assists per game.

Career statistics

College

|-
| style="text-align:left;"| 2018–19
| style="text-align:left;"| Maryland
| 34 || 33 || 29.0 || .430 || .406 || .774 || 2.9 || 2.1 || .3 || .3 || 8.6
|-
| style="text-align:left;"| 2019–20
| style="text-align:left;"| Maryland
| 31 || 20 || 27.8 || .358 || .274 || .725 || 2.9 || 2.5 || .4 || .1 || 8.5
|-
| style="text-align:left;"| 2020–21
| style="text-align:left;"| Maryland
| 29 || 28 || 33.6 || .437 || .337 || .831 || 4.3 || 2.2 || 1.2 || .1 || 15.1
|-
| style="text-align:left;"| 2021–22
| style="text-align:left;"| Maryland
| 31 || 29 || 33.4 || .383 || .339 || .688 || 4.6 || 2.1 || 0.8 || .1 || 14.7
|- class="sortbottom"
| style="text-align:center;" colspan="2"| Career
| 125 || 110 || 30.9 || .402 || .337 || .758 || 3.7 || 2.2 || .6 || .2 || 11.6

References

External links
Maryland Terrapins bio

1999 births
Living people
American men's basketball players
Basketball players from Wilmington, Delaware
IMG Academy alumni
Keflavík men's basketball players
Maryland Terrapins men's basketball players
Point guards
Puerto Rican men's basketball players
Shooting guards
Úrvalsdeild karla (basketball) players